Michele Godino (born 11 January 1992) is an Italian snowboarder. He competed in the 2018 Winter Olympics.

References

1992 births
Living people
Snowboarders at the 2018 Winter Olympics
Italian male snowboarders
Olympic snowboarders of Italy
21st-century Italian people